Toriyama (written: 鳥山, 通山) is a Japanese surname. Notable people with this surname include:

 Airi Toriyama (born 1989), Japanese actress and singer
 Akira Toriyama (born 1955), Japanese manga and game artist
 Akira Toriyama (ophthalmologist) (1898–1994), Japanese ophthalmologist and photographer
 Motomu Toriyama, Japanese game director and scenario writer
 Toriyama Sekien (1712–1788), scholar and ukiyo-e artist

Japanese-language surnames